The men's 3000 metres steeplechase at the 2018 IAAF World U20 Championships was held at Ratina Stadium on 12 and 15 July.

Records

Results

Heats
Qualification: First 5 of each heat (Q) and the 5 fastest times (q) qualified for the final.

Final

References

3000 metres steeplechase
Steeplechase at the World Athletics U20 Championships